Kids MBA Ltd is a UK-based company. It provides educational services under the KidsMBA brand. It was formed to provide a training programme that introduces young people to many of the issues and skills needed in business and self-employment. Designed to complement and enhance pre-school leavers’ education with a real-world taster of the life skills, know-how and aptitude required to run a business or become an entrepreneur, the KidsMBA Programme opens up the concept of self-employment and business management to young people from all walks of life.

History
Whilst school provides a broad-based education for children that education does not extend to preparing children with the skills needed  in self-employment or to run their own business.

The KidsMBA Programme was developed in the UK by Barrister and Professor Mark Watson-Gandy  as part of his call for children to receive basic business education at schools. First delivered in 2016 at St Columba's Catholic Boys' School  in Bexleyheath, England, the KidsMBA programme  has since been delivered internationally.

The Programme

The 10 hour intensive programme  is traditionally taught over 2 days by lecture, roll play, discussion and games. With participants receiving a KidsMBA badge and Certificate of Achievement which allow them to compete in an international competition.

References

Education companies of the United Kingdom